The Queensland Railways 6D13 class locomotive was a class of 0-6-2T steam locomotives operated by the Queensland Railways.

History
In 1881, the Queensland Land & Coal Company purchased two locomotives for a proposed colliery on the Burrum coalfields near Maryborough that would join with the Queensland Railway’s network at Torbanlea. After the proposal fell through, they were sold to the Queensland Railways, entering service on the Southern & Western Railway. They were used as shunters.

Per Queensland Railway's classification system, they were designated the 6D13 class, the 6 representing the number of driving wheels, the D that it was a tank locomotive, and the 13 the cylinder diameter in inches.

Class list

References

Neilson locomotives
Railway locomotives introduced in 1884
6D13
0-6-2T locomotives
3 ft 6 in gauge locomotives of Australia